Beatrice is an unincorporated community in Stone County, Mississippi, and is located approximately  southeast of Wiggins. Beatrice is part of the Gulfport-Biloxi metropolitan area.  The main period of significance was between 1894 and 1915.

Surrounded by the De Soto National Forest, Beatrice has long been a timber and sawmill community.  In the wake of Hurricane Katrina, the Beatrice Sawmill served as a distribution center for portable sawmills that were needed to convert storm-ravaged trees into lumber.

Little Creek Baptist Church and headquarters for Red Creek Wildlife Management Area are located in the Beatrice community.

Education 
The Beatrice community is served by the Stone County School District.

Transportation 
The Beatrice community is served by Mississippi Highway 15.

Notoriety 
On the night of January 24, 2015, 57-year-old Timmy Garrison, owner of Beatrice Sawmill was found dead outside his place of business.  Subsequent investigation by law enforcement revealed a murder-for-hire involving Evelyn Garrison, wife of the murder victim; Emmett Entriken, her childhood friend; and Entriken's distant cousin, Jody Parks.  On March 10, 2017, 23-year-old Jody Parks pleaded guilty to capital murder and was sentenced to life in prison with no possibility of parole.  On August 21, 2017, 56-year-old Evelyn Garrison accepted a plea of first-degree murder and received a sentence of life in prison with the possibility of parole.  On September 16, 2017, the third suspect, 67-year-old Emmett Entriken, pleaded guilty to first-degree murder and was sentenced to life in prison with the possibility of parole.

References 

Unincorporated communities in Mississippi
Unincorporated communities in Stone County, Mississippi
Gulfport–Biloxi metropolitan area